St. Paul's Church is a historic Episcopal church at 50 Park Place in Pawtucket, Rhode Island.  It is a stone Gothic Revival structure, designed by Sanders & Thornton of Providence and built in 1901, for a congregation established in 1816.  The property also includes a Guild Hall, built in the Tudor Revival style in 1915, and a 1963 brick office wing.  A Revere bell hangs in the church belfry.

The church was listed on the National Register of Historic Places in 1983.

See also
National Register of Historic Places listings in Pawtucket, Rhode Island

References

Churches completed in 1901
20th-century Episcopal church buildings
Episcopal churches in Rhode Island
Churches on the National Register of Historic Places in Rhode Island
Buildings and structures in Pawtucket, Rhode Island
Churches in Providence County, Rhode Island
National Register of Historic Places in Pawtucket, Rhode Island